The 1988–89 season was FC Lokomotiv Gorna Oryahovitsa's third season in A PFG.

First-team squad 

 18/0
 28/0
 26/1 
 30/0
 29/1
 29/10
 3/0
 25/3
 10/1
 24/1
 18/0
 14/1

 12/0
 15/0
 6/1
 26/0
 4/0
 13/4
 10/0
 2/0 
 11/1
 10/0
 2/0
 2/0

Fixtures

League

The team is finished 12th after 30 games in his third "A"group's season.

League standings

Cup
Lokomotiv GO dropped after the loss of second divisional Hebаr

1/8 finals

References

External links
 1988–89 A PFG
 Lokomotiv Gorna Oryahovitsa official website

FC Lokomotiv Gorna Oryahovitsa seasons
Lokomotiv Gorna Oryahovitsa